Hypsagonus corniger is a fish in the family Agonidae. It was described by Anatoly Yakovlevich Taranetz in 1933. It is a marine, polar water-dwelling fish which is known from the southern Okhotsk Sea and the northern Sea of Japan, in the northwestern Pacific Ocean.

References

corniger
Fish described in 1933